Harendra Kumar Sur (1893 - 3 Oct. 1964) was an anti-colonial Bengali politician, and a representative of East Pakistan to the Constituent Assembly of Pakistan.

Sur was a lawyer by training. In the 1937 Bengal Provincial Assembly Elections, Sur filed his nomination from Noakhali from the Indian National Congress. He drubbed his opponent, an independent candidate. He did not seek re-election to the Assembly in 1946; nonetheless, he was elected by the Assembly on a Congress ticket to the Constituent Assembly of India. After partition, Noakhali went to Pakistan and Majumdar became a member of the Constituent Assembly of Pakistan. During the Noakhali riots, he opened a peace camp at Chowmuhani.

Sur died on 3 October 1964 at R. G. Kar Medical College and Hospital, Kolkata.

Notes

References

Pakistani MNAs 1947–1954
1964 deaths
Members of the Constituent Assembly of Pakistan